The yellowtail tubelip (Yellowtail Tubelip wrasse or Diproctacanthus xanthurus), is a species of wrasse native to coral reefs of the western central Pacific Ocean near Palau, Indonesia, Great barrier reef, Philippines and New Guinea at depths from . The juveniles act as cleaner fish, while the adults primarily prey on coral polyps. It can be found in the aquarium trade. This species is the only known member of its genus. Other common names for the yellowtail tubelip are cleaner wrasse, Wandering cleaner wrasse, yellowtail wrasse, lulukdayan and ect.

Description 
The yellowtail tubelip has a clear white and dark brown striped body with a total of 9 dorsal fines, 9 to 10 Doral soft rays, 2 anal spines, 9-11 anal soft spines and 25 vertebrae.

References

External links
 

Labridae
Fish described in 1856
Taxa named by Pieter Bleeker